Charlebois can refer to:

People

 Bob Charlebois (1944-), Canadian ice hockey player
 Lucie Charlebois, (1959), Canadian politician
 Robert Charlebois (1944), Canadian author, actor, composer and singer
 Sylvain Charlebois (1970), Canadian researcher, food and agriculture expert

Places
 Charlebois railway station in Charlebois, Manitoba, Canada

Other uses

 Charlebois v. Saint John (City) a Supreme Court of Canada decision on language.